The 2006–07 season was the 115th season in Liverpool Football Clubs existence and was their 45th consecutive year in the top-flight, and covers the period between 1 July 2006 to 30 June 2007. Having finished third the previous season, Liverpool had qualified for the UEFA Champions League third qualifying round.

Players

First-team squad

Reserves
These players did not appear for the first-team this season, but may have been a substitute.

Transfers

In

Out

In on loan

 In:  £16,400,000+
 Out:  £27,216,000+
 Total spending:  £10,816,000

Season summary

August
Liverpool began the season in the third qualifying round of the Champions League, beating Israel's Maccabi Haifa on a 3–2 aggregate score, in a 2–1 win at Anfield. The season started well for Craig Bellamy, a new signing from Blackburn Rovers, and Mark González, who returned from a loan spell at Real Sociedad: both made their debuts against Haifa, and both scored. Peter Crouch helped finish the operation in Kiev (the match was not played in Haifa due to security concerns). Liverpool also won the Community Shield as goals from Crouch and John Arne Riise helped them beat Chelsea 2–1 at the Millennium Stadium.

Liverpool's Premier League campaign began with a 1–1 draw at Bramall Lane against newly promoted Sheffield United. Their first league win of the season came at home against West Ham United, a 2–1 win secured by goals from Crouch and Daniel Agger.

September
Liverpool lost the Merseyside derby 3–0 at Goodison Park when Everton's Tim Cahill and Andrew Johnson scored once and twice respectively. In the opening match of the group stage of the Champions League the Reds drew 0–0 with PSV in Eindhoven. This was followed by a 1–0 loss away to Chelsea and two home wins against Newcastle United (2–0) and Tottenham Hotspur (3–0). The Newcastle game was especially notable for a long-range goal scored by Xabi Alonso from inside the Liverpool half. They also beat Galatasaray 3–2 at Anfield. Their last game of September ended in a 2–0 defeat away to Bolton Wanderers.

October
Liverpool's next league match was a 1–1 home draw with Blackburn Rovers, a game where Craig Bellamy scored his first league goal for the club against his previous team. In the Champions League Liverpool beat Bordeaux 1–0 in France but lost a crucial derby match against Manchester United 2–0 at Old Trafford just four days later. after. They then faced Bordeaux at Anfield, a match they won 3–0 thanks to Luis García (2) and Steven Gerrard, the captain's first goal of the season. They also progressed in the League Cup after a 4–3 win over Reading, and beat Aston Villa 3–1 in the league, ending the away side's run of nine unbeaten matches from the beginning of the campaign.

November
November started well with a 2–0 win over Reading in the Premier League and a League Cup victory (1–0) against Birmingham City. They beat PSV 2–0 in the Champions League.

December
Liverpool started December with a 4–0 win against Wigan Athletic, their first away victory of the campaign. They achieved a second consecutive Premier League 4–0 against Fulham after a disappointing 3–2 defeat by Galatasaray in the Champions League. This was followed by two further wins with Charlton Athletic, beaten 3–0 at The Valley, and Watford, defeated 2–0 at Anfield. However, Liverpool lost their next match 1–0 away to Blackburn Rovers before ending the year with a 1–0 win at Tottenham Hotspur.

January
In the first week of January, Liverpool faced Arsenal twice, both at Anfield, once in the FA Cup and once in the League Cup. Both times, the Gunners came away with victory, 3–1 and 6–3 respectively. However, Liverpool beat both Bolton Wanderers and Watford 3–0 either side of the Arsenal games. They also beat Chelsea 2–0 at Anfield on Petr Čech's first match back after his horrific head injury.

February
Liverpool drew 0–0 in the Merseyside derby at Anfield. They knocked Barcelona out of the Champions League in the round of 16 on away goals after Craig Bellamy and John Arne Riise put two past Víctor Valdés at the Camp Nou.

March
In between the Barça games, Liverpool beat Sheffield United 4–0, with Robbie Fowler scoring twice from the penalty spot, which proved to be his last goals for the club. However, they lost 1–0 to local rivals Manchester United courtesy to an injury time winner by United substitute John O'Shea. Liverpool then drew 0–0 with Aston Villa at Villa Park, before beating Arsenal 4–1 at Anfield, Peter Crouch scoring a hat trick with Daniel Agger scoring the other.

April
Liverpool comfortably put PSV out of the Champions League in the quarter-finals, winning 4–0 on aggregate. A 3–0 victory in Eindhoven was followed by a 1–0 win in the return leg at Anfield. In between the two matches they travelled to Reading, a game which they won 2–1. The next three league games yielded a 0–0 draw away to Manchester City and two home wins against Middlesbrough and Wigan Athletic, both games ending 2–0. They lost 1–0 to Chelsea in the first leg of the Champions League semi-final after a goal by Joe Cole. Ahead of the second leg against the London side, a much-changed Liverpool team lost 2–1 away to Portsmouth.

May
Liverpool reached their second Champions League final in three years after beating Chelsea on penalties following a 1–0 win at Anfield. In the final, they faced AC Milan, their 2005 adversaries; Milan exacted their revenge, winning 2–1 with two goals from Filippo Inzaghi. Dirk Kuyt replied for the Reds but it was not enough to stop Milan.

Results

Pre-season

Premier League

Premier League results by round

Classification

Results summary

Champions League

Third Qualifying Round

Group Stage

Knockout Stage

Final

FA Cup

League Cup

Statistics

Appearances

Top scorers

References

Notes

External links
2006–07 Season at Official Website
2007–07 Season at LFC History

Liverpool F.C. seasons
Liverpool